The University of Kerbala (UoK) is a university located in the city of Kerbala, Iraq. The university was founded in 2002. The university has an impact role in the academic research. It is located in a very popular city, Kerbala.

Colleges
College of Medicine
College of Dentistry
College of Pharmacy
College of Engineering
College of Agriculture
College of Law
College of Education
College of Science
College of Management and Economics

External links
Official website 

Kerbala
2002 establishments in Iraq
Karbala